Tau (Τ or τ) is the 19th letter of the Greek alphabet.

Tau may also refer to:

Mathematics
 Tau (mathematical constant), a circle constant equal to  (6.28318...)
 Tau test in statistics (tau-a, tau-b and tau-c tests or Kendall tau rank correlation coefficient)
 Tau function (disambiguation), several

Geography
Tau, Norway, a small town in Strand municipality, Rogaland county, Norway
Tău (disambiguation), two villages in Romania
Ta‘ū, an island in the Manua Island Group of American Samoa
Ta'u County, a county in American Samoa
Tau (Tongatapu), an island of the Tongatapu group in Tonga
Tau (Haapai), an island of the Haapai group in Tonga
Tau (Botswana), a village at the base of the Tswapong Hills in Botswana

Science and technology
 TAU (spacecraft), a proposal to send a space probe to a thousand astronomical units from the Earth
 Tau (particle), also called Tau lepton, an elementary particle in particle physics
 Tau emerald, a species of dragonfly
 Tau neutrino a subatomic elementary particle
 Tau protein, a biochemical protein associated with microtubules
 Tau, the standard astronomical abbreviation for Taurus (constellation)
 Tau, a mutation in the Casein kinase 1 epsilon protein, in circadian biology
 Rational Tau, a UML and SysML modeling tool
 Opsanus tau, the scientific name for the oyster toadfish

Arts and media
 Tau (film), a 2018 thriller film starring Maika Monroe
 Tău (Negură Bunget album), a 2015 album by Romanian black metal band Negură Bunget
 Tau, an alien race from Warhammer 40,000
 Tau, a character in the Battle Arena Toshinden fighting game series
 Pan Tau, hero of Czech films and television series
 Tau Zero, a novel by Poul Anderson
 Tau Volantis, a planet shown in Dead Space 3
 Tau Cannon, an energy weapon from the video game Half-Life
Tau Films, an American visual effects and animation company
Colony Tau, a location from Xenoblade Chronicles 3

Education
 Tama Art University
 Tel Aviv University
 Texila American University
 Anna University of Technology, Tiruchirappalli

People
 Abel Tau, South African politician
 Jimmy Tau, South African football (soccer) player
 Max Tau, German-Norwegian writer, editor, and publisher
 Nicolae Țâu, Moldovan politician who was Foreign Minister of Moldova between 1990 and 1993
 Parks Tau, South African politician who was mayor of Johannesburg from 2011-2016
 Tau (rapper), Polish rapper
 Devi Lal (politician), Indian politician who was Deputy Prime Minister from 1989 to 1991

Other
 Tau (mythology), an evil spirit in Guaraní mythology
 Tau effect, a sensory illusion relating to the perception of space
 Cross of Tau, a Christian symbol so called due to its resemblance to the letter Tau
 Tourist Association of Ukraine
 The Greek letter representing Expiration (options)

See also
 Tau function (disambiguation)